Vaigattøyane is a group of islands in Hinlopen Strait, between Spitsbergen and Nordaustlandet of the Svalbard archipelago. The island group is named after Waygat, a previous name of Hinlopenstretet.

The largest island of the group is Wahlbergøya, while other islands are Von Otterøya, Nyströmøya and Berggrenøya.

References

Islands of Svalbard